The Hibiscus Coast is a populated area on a stretch of the Hauraki Gulf coast in New Zealand's Auckland Region. It has a population of  making it the 11th most populous urban area in New Zealand, and the second most populous in the Auckland Region, behind Auckland itself. 

As an urban area delineated by Statistics New Zealand, the Hibiscus Coast consists of Hatfields Beach, Orewa, Silverdale and Whangaparaoa Peninsula. It includes several small suburban residential and commercial areas such as Stanmore Bay, Arkles Bay, Army Bay, Manly, Red Beach, Gulf Harbour, Tindalls Beach and Matakatia.

The Hibiscus Coast is part of the Albany ward of the Auckland Council region. It is also in the Hibiscus Coast Subdivision of the Hibiscus and Bays Local Board area, the other subdivision being East Coast Bays, to the south. The Hibiscus Coast Subdivision extends beyond the Statistics New Zealand area to include Waiwera to the north, and through Stillwater to the south as far as the Okura River. From 1989 to 2010 the Hibiscus Coast was part of Rodney District, until Rodney District Council became part of the amalgamated Auckland Council.

Recreation
The Hibiscus Coast has a number of beaches that attract people to live there. Other places of interest on the coast or nearby include Snow Planet, Silverdale Adventure Park, the Pacific Plaza (and surrounding shopping centre), Hoyts 5 cinema, the Waiwera Hot Pools (now abandoned), Orewa Beach, Shakespear Regional Park, and Gulf Harbour. Gulf Harbour is near the end of the Whangaparaoa Peninsula, which is quite close to the wildlife reserve Tiritiri Matangi Island. Ferries transport people to the island from the harbour and back on a regular basis.

The Hibiscus Coast Raiders rugby league club and Hibiscus Coast AFC soccer club are both based in Stanmore Bay, along with Silverdale rugby club based in Silverdale.

References

External links
 Hibiscus Coast at Auckland Council's Auckland Unlimited website

 
Hibiscus and Bays Local Board Area
Coastline of New Zealand
Landforms of the Auckland Region